Hala Arena , generally called simply Arena, is an indoor sporting arena in the Grunwald district of the city of Poznań in western Poland. It is primarily used for volleyball, other indoor sports, and concerts. The venue opened in 1974 and seats approximately 5,500 people, depending on type of event.

The arena hosted a preliminary round group of the EuroBasket 2009 competition.

In 1985 Hala Arena hosted the Rock Arena two day festival headlined by Hanoi Rocks and Pretty Maids.

Hala was the penultimate site, on August 19, 1990, of the Rolling Stones 1989-1990 Steel Wheels/Urban Jungle Tour.

References

External links 

Indoor arenas in Poland
Sport in Poznań
Buildings and structures in Poznań
Sports venues in Greater Poland Voivodeship
Basketball venues in Poland